Ricky O'Loughlin (born 4 July 1979) is a former indigenous Australian rules footballer who played with Adelaide in the Australian Football League (AFL).

O'Loughlin made his senior debut in 1999 in the South Australian National Football League (SANFL) with Port Adelaide and was drafted by Adelaide at pick 51 in the 1999 AFL draft. A half forward, O'Loughlin played his first AFL match at the Gabba, five rounds into the 2000 AFL season, with Jonathan Brown, Aaron Shattock and Rhett Biglands also making their league debuts.

In two seasons, O'Loughlin managed only nine appearances and spent most of his time in the SANFL. He was rookie listed at his brother Michael's club Sydney Swans in 2002 but could not break into the seniors.

References

Holmesby, Russell and Main, Jim (2007). The Encyclopedia of AFL Footballers. 7th ed. Melbourne: Bas Publishing.

1979 births
Living people
Australian rules footballers from South Australia
Adelaide Football Club players
Port Adelaide Magpies players
Indigenous Australian players of Australian rules football